Dan Dinneen (October 6, 1870–December 6, 1948) was an American businessman and politician.

Dinneen was born in Decatur, Illinois. He went to the Decatur parochial schools and to Decatur High School. He worked for the railroad. In 1892, he worked in his family's retail grocery business. In 1911, he sold the grocery business. Dinneen served as mayor of Decatur from 1911 to 1919 and was a Republican. He worked for the Illinois State Employment Office and as a mediator for state labor disputes. Dinneen served in the Illinois House of Representatives from 1935 until his death in 1948. He died at St. Mary's Hospital in Decatur, Illinois.

Notes

1870 births
1948 deaths
Mayors of Decatur, Illinois
Businesspeople from Illinois
Republican Party members of the Illinois House of Representatives